The Bezirksliga Bayern was the highest association football league in the German state of Bavaria from 1923 to 1933. The league was disbanded with the rise of the Nazis to power in 1933.

Overview
The league was formed in 1923, after a league reform which was decided upon in Darmstadt, Hesse.

Until the introduction of the Bezirksliga, the Kreisliga Südbayern and Kreisliga Nordbayern were the highest leagues in the state.

The league started out with eight clubs from all over the state of Bavaria, but without any teams from the Palatinate region (German:Pfalz), then politically a part of Bavaria but not geographically connected to the rest of the state. The eight clubs played each other in a home-and-away round with the two top teams advancing to the Southern German championship, which in turn was a qualification tournament for the German championship.

In its second season, the league started to incooperate clubs from the city of Ulm, Württemberg, which lays right across the border from Bavaria. Otherwise, the modus of the league remained unchanged but only the league champion qualified for the Southern German finals in this season.

For the 1926–27 season, the league was expanded to ten teams. The top team was again qualified for the finals. Additionally, the SpVgg Fürth as Southern German cup winner also qualified for this round. The runners-up of the Bezirksligas in the south also played a championship round to determine a third team from the region to go to the German finals.

After this season, the league was split into a northern and a southern group, the north having nine and the south seven teams. The winner of each division would advance to the Southern German finals while the two runners-up again played in a separate round like in the previous season.

The 1928–29 season saw no change in modus but both leagues now operated on a strength of eight clubs. The qualification system for the finals also remained unchanged. This system remained in place until 1931.

For the 1931–32 season, both divisions were expanded to ten teams. The top-two teams from each league then advanced to the Southern German finals, which were now staged in two regional groups with a finals game between the two group winners at the end. The same system applied for the final season of the league in 1932–33.

With the rise of the Nazis to power, the Gauligas were introduced as the highest football leagues in Germany. In Bavaria, the Gauliga Bayern replaced the Bezirksliga Bayern as the highest level of play. The twelve best teams from Bavaria qualified for this new, statewide league.

National success
The clubs from the Bezirksliga Bayern were among the most successful in Germany in this era, specifically the 1. FC Nürnberg.

Southern German championship
Qualified teams and their success:
 1924: 
 SpVgg Fürth, Runners-up
 1. FC Nürnberg, Southern German champions
 1925:
 1. FC Nürnberg, Runners-up
 1926:
 SpVgg Fürth, Runners-up
 FC Bayern Munich, Southern German champions
 1927:
 TSV 1860 Munich, Winner of the Bezirksliga-runners-up round
 SpVgg Fürth, Runners-up
 1. FC Nürnberg, Southern German champions
 1928:
 VfR Fürth, 7th place in the Bezirksliga-runners-up round southwest division
 TSV 1860 Munich, 3rd place in the Bezirksliga-runners-up round southwest division
 1. FC Nürnberg, 2nd place in the Bezirksliga-runners-up round southwest division
 Wacker München, Winner of the Bezirksliga-runners-up round southwest division, winner division final
 SpVgg Fürth, 3rd place
 FC Bayern Munich, Southern German champions
 1929:
 ASV Nürnberg, 7th place in the Bezirksliga-runners-up round southwest division
 TSV 1860 Munich, 3rd place in the Bezirksliga-runners-up round southwest division
 TSV Schwaben Augsburg, 2nd place in the Bezirksliga-runners-up round southwest division
 SpVgg Fürth, Winner of the Bezirksliga-runners-up round southwest division, winner division final
 FC Bayern Munich, Runners-up
 1. FC Nürnberg, Southern German champions
 1930:
 Jahn Regensburg, 6th place in the Bezirksliga-runners-up round southwest division
 ASV Nürnberg, 5th place in the Bezirksliga-runners-up round southwest division
 TSV 1860 Munich, 2nd place in the Bezirksliga-runners-up round southwest division
 1. FC Nürnberg, Winner of the Bezirksliga-runners-up round southwest division, winner division final
 FC Bayern Munich, 3rd place
 SpVgg Fürth, Runners-up
 1931: 
 VfR Fürth, 6th place in the Bezirksliga-runners-up round southwest division
 TSV Schwaben Augsburg, 3rd place in the Bezirksliga-runners-up round southwest division
 1. FC Nürnberg, 2nd place in the Bezirksliga-runners-up round southwest division
 TSV 1860 Munich, Winner of the Bezirksliga-runners-up round southwest division, winner division final
 FC Bayern Munich, 3rd place
 SpVgg Fürth, Southern German champions
 1932:
 TSV 1860 Munich, 6th place southwest division
 SpVgg Fürth, 5th place southwest division
 1. FC Nürnberg, 2nd place southwest division, 3rd place Southern German championship
 FC Bayern Munich, Winner southwest division, Runners-up Southern German championship
 1933:
 FC Bayern Munich, 4th place eastwest division
 1. FC Nürnberg, 3rd place eastwest division
 SpVgg Fürth, 2nd place eastwest division, 4th place in Southern German championship
 TSV 1860 Munich, Winner eastwest division, Runners-up Southern German championship

German championship
Qualified teams and their success:
 1924: 
 1. FC Nürnberg, German champions
 1925:
 1. FC Nürnberg, German champions
 1926: 
 FC Bayern Munich, First round
 SpVgg Fürth, German champions
 1927: 
 TSV 1860 Munich, Semi-finals
 SpVgg Fürth, Semi-finals
 1. FC Nürnberg, German champions
 1928:
 FC Bayern Munich, Semi-finals
 Wacker München, Semi-finals
 1929:
 FC Bayern Munich, Quarter-finals
 1. FC Nürnberg, Semi-finals
 SpVgg Fürth, German champions
 1930:
 SpVgg Fürth, Quarter-finals
 1. FC Nürnberg, Semi-finals
 1931:
 SpVgg Fürth, Quarter-finals
 TSV 1860 Munich, Final
 1932: 
 1. FC Nürnberg, Semi-finals
 FC Bayern Munich, German champions
 1933:
 TSV 1860 Munich, Semi-finals

Founding members of the league
The league was formed from eight clubs from Bavaria:
 1. FC Nürnberg  
 SpVgg Fürth  
 FC Bayern Munich  
 FV Nürnberg  
 TSV 1860 Munich  
 Wacker München  
 VfR Fürth 
 TSV Schwaben Augsburg

Winners and runners-up of the Bezirksliga Bayern

Placings in the Bezirksliga Bayern 1923–33

Clubs from the northern division

Source:
 The FV Nürnberg joined the ASV Nürnberg in 1925.

Clubs from the southern division

Source:

References

Sources
 Fussball-Jahrbuch Deutschland  (8 vol.), Tables and results of the German tier-one leagues 1919–33, publisher: DSFS
 Kicker Almanach,  The yearbook on German football from Bundesliga to Oberliga, since 1937, published by the Kicker Sports Magazine
 Süddeutschlands Fussballgeschichte in Tabellenform 1897–1988  History of Southern German football in tables, publisher & author: Ludolf Hyll

External links
 The Gauligas  Das Deutsche Fussball Archiv 
 German league tables 1892–1933  Hirschi's Fussball seiten
 Germany – Championships 1902–1945 at RSSSF.com

1
1923 establishments in Germany
1933 disestablishments in Germany
Southern German football championship
Sports leagues established in 1923
Ger